The Marbot family originated from the ancient province of Quercy, near what is now the Corrèze department in south-western France. It is of noble origin, although its members do not precede their names with any title.

Its name is engraved on the Arc de Triomphe in Paris (western pillar, 34th column).

History 

The Marbot family rose to prominence in the 17th century, becoming allied to and joining in the society of several important families of the Limousin and Quercy provinces. Its members became well established in the professions of commerce and law, which brought them considerable wealth, allowing them to acquire property and live from the income of their estates.

It has distinguished itself particularly in the career of arms, providing numerous infantry, cavalry and naval officers to the French armies, among them three generals. As from the 18th century, its members became involved with the overseas expansion of France. They were appointed to various positions in the administration of French-ruled territories, including two commissioners, an interim governor and an ordonnateur (chief administrator), until the gradual decline of the French colonial empire in the 20th century.

Members 

Notable members of this family include:
 Alfred Charles Adolphe, known as Alfred Marbot (1812–1865), French master of requests to the Council of State, uniformologist and painter
 Antoine Adolphe Marcelin, known as Adolphe Marbot (1781–1844), French maréchal de camp (brigadier general), commander of the Legion of Honour
 Charles Rémy Paul, also known as Paul Marbot (1847–1912), commissioner in the French navy, knight of the Legion of Honour
 François-Achille, also known as Achille Marbot (1817–1866), ordonnateur (chief administrator) in the French navy, interim governor of Réunion, officer of the Legion of Honour
 Jean-Antoine, also known as Antoine Marbot (1754–1800), French divisional general and politician, name inscribed on the Arc de Triomphe
 Jean-Baptiste Antoine Marcelin, known as Marcellin Marbot (1782–1854), French lieutenant-général (divisional general), grand officer of the Legion of Honour
 Louis Marie Joseph, also known as Joseph Marbot (1878–1931), French engineer, developer of the Turkish and Syrian railway networks
 Marie Rémy Joseph, known as Joseph Marbot (1862–1929), frigate captain (commander) in the French navy, officer in the French colonial infantry, officer of the Legion of Honour
 René Marie André, known as René Marbot (1922–2020), officer in the Free French Forces, lawyer and businessperson, officer of the Legion of Honour

See also 
 Names inscribed on the Arc de Triomphe in Paris
 List of Occitans
 Corrèze department in France

References

Sources 
 Chisholm, Hugh, ed. (1911). "Marbot, Jean Baptiste Antoine Marcelin; Marbot, Antoine Adolphe Marcelin". Encyclopædia Britannica (11th ed.). Cambridge University Press.
 
 
 Great Chancellery of the Order of the Legion of Honour. "Base de données Léonore". Archives nationales. Paris: French Ministry of Culture.

Citations

External links 
 The Memoirs of General Marbot at Project Gutenberg 
 Biographical note on François-Achille Marbot 
 Biographical note on René Marbot 
 The names inscribed on the Arc de Triomphe in Paris 

Families of French ancestry
Surnames
French noble families
Military history of France
Age of Enlightenment
Lists of French nobility